"Hurricane Neddy" is the eighth episode of the eighth season of the American animated television series The Simpsons. It originally aired on the Fox network in the United States on December 29, 1996 It was written by Steve Young, directed by Bob Anderson, and features a cameo by Jon Lovitz as Jay Sherman from The Critic. In the episode, a violent hurricane strikes Springfield. By pure chance, the only house destroyed belongs to Ned Flanders. As a result, Ned begins to lose his faith in God and the townspeople around him, leading to a nervous breakdown.

Plot
As Hurricane Barbara approaches Springfield, panicked citizens ransack the Kwik-E-Mart. After the storm, the Simpsons leave their basement to find their home unscathed. However, their next-door neighbor, Ned Flanders, emerges from a heap of rubble to find his house destroyed, forcing the Flanders family to take shelter in the church basement. Ned's house is uninsured, as he regards insurance as a form of gambling. Ned is further discouraged after learning that his business, The Leftorium, was looted after the storm. Distraught, Ned asks Rev. Lovejoy if God is punishing him like Job, despite his strict adherence to his faith.

The next day, Marge surprises the Flanders family with a new home, which the residents of Springfield have built, though shoddily. When Homer leans on the front door, the house immediately collapses. Finally, the lens in Ned's glasses breaks and his rage boils over after he is unable to calm himself down, furiously berating all the townspeople's flaws and failures after years of politeness, including his neighbor, Homer (who believes that he has got off "pretty easy").

Worried he is losing his mind and feeling terrible for his outburst and violent breakdown, Ned voluntarily commits himself to a mental hospital. He is visited by his childhood psychiatrist, Dr. Foster, who recalls Ned's childhood as an out-of-control brat raised by beatnik parents. Ned's treatment, the University of Minnesota Spankalogical Protocol, involved eight months of continuous spanking by Foster. The treatment worked too well and left Ned unable to express anger until the losses he suffered from the storm made him erupt in repressed violent rage.

Foster realizes that his earlier approach was flawed and enlists Homer to help Ned express his emotions. Foster thinks Homer is perfect for this treatment because of his and Ned's mutual dislike. After several scripted insults fail to rile Ned's anger, Homer disparages his apparent like of everything, to which Ned admits he hates two things: the post office and his parents. Foster declares Ned cured and releases him from the asylum.

Outside the hospital, Ned is greeted by the townsfolk of Springfield, including the rest of the Simpsons and his family. Ned promises to tell people when they offend him instead of stifling his anger, to Foster's approval, and cheerily adds he will run them down with his car if they anger him with Homer remarking that Ned is crazy.

Production

Steve Young, a writer for the Late Show with David Letterman, was brought in as a freelance writer to write the episode. The writers wanted to explore what made Flanders tick and examine what made him act the way he does. The original idea came from George Meyer, who had also wanted an episode about Flanders' faith being tested. One of the key story points came from his friend Jack Handey, a writer for Saturday Night Live, who wanted to do a sketch about a down-on-his-luck shoemaker who is visited by elves who help him, but make very bad shoes. Likewise, it inspired the idea that the neighbors would rebuild Flanders' house, but do a bad job and provoke an outburst.

A caricature of John Swartzwelder can be seen shutting the door of a room in Calmwood Mental Hospital. Later in the episode, during the scene where the townsfolk are welcoming Ned back, someone can be seen holding a sign that says "Free John Swartzwelder". During the sequence where Flanders yells at the town, a man with a ponytail and wearing a white shirt who is a caricature of Bob Anderson can be seen.

Cultural references
The scene at the beginning of the episode, in which the people of Springfield mob the Kwik-E-Mart, is based on the events of the 1992 Los Angeles riots. Todd is wearing a Butthole Surfers T-shirt; however, the censors only allowed the letters Buttho Surfers to appear onscreen, partially obscuring the band's offensive name. The opening sequence is parodied during the storm when the word Hurricane appears onscreen, accompanied by the same chorus that sings the show's name. Jay Sherman from The Critic, who had previously appeared in "A Star Is Burns", can be seen in the mental hospital repeatedly saying his catchphrase, "It stinks"; Ms. Botz from "Some Enchanted Evening" appears as a patient in a nearby room, pacing threateningly. A small door at the end of the hallway in Flanders' rebuilt house echoes the improbably small hallway in the film Willy Wonka & the Chocolate Factory. Several scenes from the hospital were taken from One Flew Over the Cuckoo's Nest.

Reception
In its original broadcast, "Hurricane Neddy" finished 18th in ratings for the week of December 23–29, 1996, with a Nielsen rating of 8.7, equivalent to approximately 8.4 million viewing households. It was the second-highest-rated show on the Fox network that week, following The X-Files.

Marge's line, "Dear God, this is Marge Simpson. If You stop this hurricane and save our family, we will be forever grateful and recommend You to all our friends", was cited by journalist Mark Pinsky as an example of how "Simpson family members are both defined and circumscribed by religion." Journalist Ben Rayner speculated that some fans, whom he called "nerds", would want an explanation of "how Barney fit through that tiny door to the 'master bedroom' in the rebuilt Flanders family home."

References

External links

1996 American television episodes
The Critic
The Simpsons (season 8) episodes
Television episodes about hurricanes
Television episodes set in psychiatric hospitals